The Arcevia Altarpiece is a 1508 oil on panel painting by Luca Signorelli, shown in the collegiate church of San Medardo in Arcevia, for which it was originally painted. It is signed below the Madonna's feet.LUCAS. SIGNORELLUS / PINGEBAT M. D. VIII

Panels
 Upper register - Saint Paul, Saint John the Baptist, God the Father Blessing and Holding a Book Inscribed Alpha and Omega, Saint Peter, Saint James the Great
 Lower register - Saint Sebastian, Saint Medardus, Madonna and Child Enthroned, Saint Andrew, Saint Roch
 Left and right columns - each has seven indistinct figures of saints, surmounting two heraldic medallions at the base (tower to the left, eagle to the right)
 Predella - Episodes from the Childhood of Christ (Annunciation, Nativity, Adoration of the Magi, Flight into Egypt, Massacre of the Innocents)

References

1508 paintings
Paintings in Marche
Paintings by Luca Signorelli
Paintings of apostles
Paintings of saints
Paintings depicting Andrew the Apostle
Paintings depicting Paul the Apostle
Paintings of Saint Roch
Paintings of Saint Sebastian
Paintings of the Madonna and Child by Luca Signorelli
Paintings of James the Great
Paintings depicting Saint Peter
Paintings depicting John the Baptist
Altarpieces
Paintings depicting the Annunciation
Adoration of the Magi in art
Paintings depicting the Flight into Egypt
Nativity of Jesus in art
Paintings depicting the Massacre of the Innocents
Books in art